Sleepless: The Concise King Crimson is a compilation by the band King Crimson, released in 1993.

Track listing

References

Albums produced by Robert Fripp
1993 compilation albums
King Crimson compilation albums